Mahmoud Awad is a Lebanese Shia politician and pediatrician. He was elected to a parliament in 1992 and 1996. Awad is a member of the board of the Zahra Hospital.

References

Living people
20th-century Lebanese politicians
Lebanese pediatricians
Year of birth missing (living people)
Place of birth missing (living people)